Farma Way (April 2, 1987 – November 18, 1999) was an American Thoroughbred racehorse and sire foaled in Kentucky. As a four-year-old in 1991 he was one of the leading racehorses in North America, winning the Santa Anita Handicap, Pimlico Special, San Antonio Handicap, San Pasqual Handicap and San Carlos Handicap.  He was also the winner of the 1991 American Championship Racing Series.

Background
Farma Way was a brown horse bred in Kentucky by Mr. & Mrs. C. D. Callaway III. He was sired by Santa Anita Derby winner Marfa out of the Diplomat Way mare, Fine Tribute, a descendant of the very important sire, Nearco.

Farma Way was originally trained by Neil Boyce but was later transferred to D. Wayne Lukas.

Racing career
Farma Way lost his first four starts.  After he ran second in the Hollywood Futurity, Boyce put him in the turf Baldwin Stakes, which was a surface change and resulted in a win.

In his fourth year, the colt won the Santa Anita Handicap and set a 1 3/16 mile track record for Pimlico Race Course in winning the 1991  Pimlico Special. His time of 1:52 2/5 also equalled the North American record for 1 3/16 miles on dirt set by Riva Ridge in 1973 at Aqueduct Racetrack. As of January 2008, their record still stands.

His headstrong ways, however, were his undoing and the cause of a 2-year dispute between jockey Gary Stevens and Farma Way's trainer, D. Wayne Lukas.  Farma Way got into a duel with Jolie's Halo, and Stevens could not rate him, allowing Festin to win a race in which Farma Way was favored.  When Lukas berated Stevens in public after the race, Stevens instructed his agent to refuse any Lukas mounts.  It was two years before Stevens rode for Lukas again.

Stud record
Retired to Balla Vista Farm, in California, Farma Way was a successful sire.  Some of his progeny include graded stakes race winners Birr, Cobra King, Dontbotherknocking, Rob N Gin, and Ruby Surprise.

Farma Way had to be put down on November 18, 1999, after fracturing his hind leg in a paddock accident.

Pedigree

References

External links
 Masters of the Saddle Gary Stevens

1987 racehorse births
1999 racehorse deaths
Racehorses bred in Kentucky
Racehorses trained in the United States
American Grade 1 Stakes winners
Thoroughbred family 20
Horse racing track record setters